The 1992–93 FA Premier League was the inaugural season of the Premier League, the top division of English football. The season began on 15 August 1992 and ended on 11 May 1993. The league was made up of the 22 clubs that broke away from The Football League at the end of the 1991–92 season. The new league was backed up by a five-year, £305 million deal with Sky to televise Premier League matches. In concept, the Premier League was identical to the old First Division of the Football League, which was now reduced to three divisions.

Overview

Background

In May 1992–93, the breakaway league signed a broadcasting rights contract with Sky and the BBC valued at £304 million, the largest such agreement in the history of British sport. The league's executive committee was unable, however, to secure title sponsorship for the new competition after eight clubs blocked a proposed £13 million deal with brewers Bass. Nonetheless, clubs began to utilise their dramatically increased wealth to fund a series of high-profile transfers.

Although the idea of a super league had been mentioned by football's governing bodies and evaluated by the media since the mid 1980s, plans for a new Premier League of 22 clubs were first unveiled by the Football Association in October 1990, and included in the Football Association's Blueprint for the Future of Football, published in June 1991. The majority of First Division clubs, particularly long-established top clubs including Arsenal and Manchester United, were in favour of a breakaway from the Football League, although Football League president Bill Fox criticised the planned Premier League as an attempt by the Football Association to "hijack" the First Division. 

Shortly before the season began, newly promoted Blackburn Rovers signed Southampton's 21-year-old England international striker Alan Shearer for a new British record fee variously reported as £3.3 million, £3.4 million, or £3.6 million. Several other players moved for fees of £2 million or more, including Arsenal's David Rocastle, who joined Leeds United, Dean Saunders, who moved from Liverpool to Aston Villa, and Teddy Sheringham, who left Nottingham Forest for Tottenham Hotspur.

The structure of the new league was identical to that of the previous season's Football League First Division, comprising 22 teams, with each playing the other 21 twice for a total of 42 matches. Ipswich Town and Middlesbrough had been promoted from the old Second Division as champions and runners-up respectively, and Blackburn Rovers took the third promotion place after winning the 1991–92 Second Division playoff.

Season summary
The first Premier League title went to Manchester United, the club's first title for 26 years. Their title was achieved with a 10-point lead over runners-up Aston Villa. Norwich City led the table for much of the season, but their challenge faded in the final weeks of the season and were out of contention three games before the season was over after they lost 3–1 to Ipswich Town. Norwich did however finish in third place, achieving European qualification in Mike Walker's debut season as manager; with a goal difference of −4, this is the highest Premier League finish by a team with a negative goal difference. Blackburn, in the top division for the first time in almost 30 years, finished in fourth place. They briefly led the league early in the season, but suffered a shortage of goals after Alan Shearer, who had scored 16 times before the turn of the year, suffered a torn cruciate ligament and missed the second half of the season. The title race was largely between the clubs who finished in the top four after early challenges from the likes of Arsenal, Coventry City, and Queens Park Rangers were not sustained.

Nottingham Forest's league form had suffered through the sale of key players like Des Walker and Teddy Sheringham, and they were bottom of the Premier League for much of the 1992–93 season. Their relegation was confirmed in early May when they lost to Sheffield United, and manager Brian Clough announced his retirement after 18 years as manager, which had yielded one league title, two European Cups and four League Cups. Next to go were newly promoted Middlesbrough, who fell from mid-table at Christmas to go down in second from bottom place. Last to go down were Crystal Palace, who failed to win their final game of the season which would have instead consigned Oldham Athletic to the final relegation place - Oldham's survival was secured with a thrilling 4–3 win over Southampton.

Title holders Leeds United finished 17th, which was the lowest finish from a defending league champion since Ipswich Town finished 17th in 1962–63 after having won the title in 1961–62, and the lowest any top tier champions have so far finished in the Premier League. Leeds failed to win an away game in the league. The lowest a defending champion has finished since then has been 12th (Leicester City in 2016–17, having won the title in 2015–16).

The top scorer in the new Premier League was Teddy Sheringham, who found the net for Nottingham Forest in their opening game of the season before being sold to Tottenham Hotspur, scoring a further 21 goals for the North London side in the league. PFA Player of the Year was Paul McGrath of Aston Villa. FWA Player of the Year was Chris Waddle, who helped Sheffield Wednesday achieve runners-up spot in both of the cups after ending his three-year spell in France. PFA Young Player of the Year was Ryan Giggs, who won the award for the second year running, and also picked up a league title medal with Manchester United.

On 26 January, Wimbledon hosted Everton at Selhurst Park in from of a crowd of just over 3,000. To date this remains the lowest attendance recorded at a Premier League match.

Teams
Twenty-two teams competed in the league – the top nineteen teams from the First Division and the three teams promoted from the Second Division. The promoted teams were Ipswich Town, Middlesbrough and Blackburn Rovers, returning to the top flight after an absence of six, three and twenty-six years respectively. They replaced Luton Town, Notts County and West Ham United, ending Luton Town's ten-year spell in the top flight, whilst both Notts County and West Ham United were relegated after only one year in the top flight.

Stadiums and locations

Personnel and kits
(as of 9 May 1993)

Managerial changes

League table

Results

Season statistics

Scoring

Top scorers 

The top goalscorer in the Premier League's inaugural season was Teddy Sheringham, who scored one goal for Nottingham Forest before his early-season transfer followed by 21 for Tottenham Hotspur for a total of 22. Alan Shearer had scored 16 goals by Christmas before suffering a season-ending injury.

Hat-tricks 

Note: (H) – Home; (A) – Away

Top assists

Individual awards

The Professional Footballers' Association (PFA) presented its annual Players' Player of the Year award to Paul McGrath, a veteran central defender who contributed to Aston Villa's second-place finish in the Premier League. Manchester United's Paul Ince came second and Blackburn's Alan Shearer third. The Young Player of the Year award was given to Ryan Giggs, the 19-year-old Manchester United left winger who had also won the award in the previous season. Giggs, who finished ahead of Tottenham's Nick Barmby and Nottingham Forest's Roy Keane, became the first player to win the award more than once.

The Football Writers' Association (the FWA) chose Chris Waddle as its Footballer of the Year. Waddle, who made his return to English football with Sheffield Wednesday after three years in France with Olympique Marseille, became the first Wednesday player to win the award in its 45-year history. McGrath and Giggs finished in second and joint third place respectively in the writers' poll.

The PFA also selected eleven players to form its Team of the Year. The team included four Manchester United players (Giggs, Ince, Peter Schmeichel and Gary Pallister) and two from Leeds United (Tony Dorigo and Gary Speed). The other members of the team were McGrath, Keane, Shearer, David Bardsley (Queens Park Rangers) and Ian Wright (Arsenal). The Manager of the Year award, chosen by a panel representing football's governing body, the media, and fans, was given to Manchester United manager Alex Ferguson. The newly formed League Managers Association also presented its own Manager of the Year award for the first time, specifically designed to recognise "the manager who made best use of the resources available to him". This award went to Dave Bassett of Sheffield United.

See also
1992–93 in English football

References

External links
League and cup results for all the 1992/93 Premier Division clubs at footballsite
1992–93 Premier League season at Rec.Sport.Soccer Statistics Foundation

 
Premier League seasons
Eng